Reynaldo Díaz Padilla (born August 19, 1991, in Mazatlán, Sinaloa) is a Mexican professional footballer who last played for Ocelotes UNACH.

References

External links
 
 

1991 births
Living people
Mexican footballers
Association football defenders
Chiapas F.C. footballers
Ocelotes UNACH footballers
Liga MX players
Liga Premier de México players
Footballers from Sinaloa
Sportspeople from Mazatlán
21st-century Mexican people